Amatzia may refer to:

Places
 Amatzia (moshav), a moshav in south-central Israel in the Lakhish Regional Council

People
 Amaziah of Judah, a king of Judah in the Book of Kings

See also
 Amaziah